Dear Evan Hansen: Original Motion Picture Soundtrack is the soundtrack album to the 2021 film of the same name, released on September 24, 2021, by Interscope Records. Based on the eponymous stage musical by Steven Levenson, Benj Pasek, and Justin Paul, the film is directed by Stephen Chbosky, with Levenson writing the screenplay and stars Ben Platt in the titular role, reprising his role from the stage performance.

The soundtrack featured most of the musical numbers from the stage play, performed by the film's ensemble cast members. Four songs were excluded from the album and instead cover versions of five of the numbers were included. Those versions were performed by Sam Smith, SZA, Summer Walker, Carrie Underwood, Dan + Shay, Finneas O'Connell, and Tori Kelly. A new song "The Anonymous Ones" was co-written by Amandla Steinberg. The musical score is composed by Dan Romer and Justin Paul, who jointly produced the album with Alex Lacamoire, who worked on the Broadway cast recording of the musical and acted as the music supervisor.

Unlike the film, which received negative reviews, the album was well received and debuted at the second position onBillboard's Top Soundtracks. The album was nominated for Best Compilation Soundtrack for Visual Media at the 64th Annual Grammy Awards. Steinberg's "The Anonymous Ones", performed by her in the film and during the end credits by SZA, was shortlisted for Best Original Song category at the 94th Academy Awards, but could not get selected for the final list of nominations.

Development 
In August 2020, it was confirmed that in addition to playing Alana Beck, Amandla Stenberg would collaborate with Pasek & Paul on the writing of a new song for her character. In August 2021, the title of this new song was revealed as "The Anonymous Ones". Stenberg, speaking to MTV News, had said that writing the song was mostly attributed to her resonation with the character, "I really love the way it unfolded, because we were able to capture the thing we were talking about in all of our meetings together, which is the fact that we're all going through it". The track was sung by American Singer, SZA who instantly connected with the song and came with few demos of the track. She opined that her version was "completely different and new, but also really respectful to the original melody and lyrics of the song". The cast performed most of the songs live on set.

With the official film website being launched in May 2021, it confirmed that the following songs would be included: "You Will Be Found", "Waving Through a Window", "For Forever", and "Words Fail". On the same day, Ben Platt stated in a Vanity Fair interview that "I think there's nothing major gone that anyone's going to miss. All of the major beats and all of the favorite songs are very much intact", while also hinting that another new song, entitled "A Little Closer", had been written for the film, later revealed to have been written for the character of Connor Murphy. On August 24, 2021, it was announced that the film's incidental underscore would be composed by Justin Paul and Dan Romer.

Four songs from the stage musical – "Anybody Have a Map?", "Disappear", "To Break In A Glove" and "Good For You" – were excluded from the soundtrack. This creative decision was negatively received by critics and audiences, largely due to the filmmakers' main goal to capture and immortalize Ben Platt's performance. Chbosky, in an interview to Variety, explained about the same saying:"We had many discussions about what each number did and what we needed. It was hard. The one song I love so much and was so sad to see go was "Anybody Have a Map?" It’s a great song and on stage, it works so well as an abstraction. It opens the show, we meet the families and the characters. But we felt the best way to tell the story was to start with Evan, start with "Waving Through a Window". And then, when you meet Connor’s parents, they’re strangers to us. We’re really on Evan’s journey. It freed us up to meet all the characters through Evan. And it binds the audience to a way in Evan that is so valuable. These were the kinds of discussions we had a lot."

Release 
The film's soundtrack album was released by Interscope Records through digital and physical formats on September 24, 2021, the same day as the film's theatrical release. It also includes covers of five of the songs by popular artists, such as Sam Smith, Finneas O'Connell, Carrie Underwood, Dan + Shay, and Tori Kelly. The first of these covers, "Only Us" (by Underwood and Dan + Shay) was released on September 3, 2021, alongside the film's version of the song. Prior to that, the film's renditions of "Waving Through a Window" and "You Will Be Found" were released as promotional singles on August 26, 2021. To promote the film, Platt performed the solo version of the latter on Season 16 of NBC's America's Got Talent, and also performed the track on The Tonight Show Starring Jimmy Fallon on September 15, 2021.

Both Stenberg and SZA's versions of "The Anonymous Ones" were released on September 10, 2021, the day after the film's world premiere. This track was later included as one of the unreleased songs from SZA's studio album Ctrl (Deluxe) on its fifth anniversary in June 2022. SZA's version of this song and Sam Smith and Summer Walker's version of "You Will Be Found" play over the closing credits, the latter song being released to the public on September 17, 2021. These were followed by "Sincerely, Me", which was released prior on September 13, 2021. Sam Smith and SZA further recorded cover editions for the soundtrack. The vinyl soundtrack was released on January 14, 2022.

Track listing

Charts

Accolades

References 

2021 soundtrack albums
2020s film soundtrack albums
Interscope Records soundtracks
Musical film soundtracks
Various artists albums